The siege of Athens can refer to any of the following battles:

 Persian sack of Athens (480 BC) - Amid which the Persians besieged a group of holdouts in the Acropolis
 Siege of Athens (404 BC) - Last battle in the Peloponnesian War
 Siege of Athens (287 BC) - Siege by Demetrius I of Macedon
 Siege of Athens and Piraeus (87–86 BC) - Siege by Lucius Cornelius Sulla Felix during the First Mithridatic War
 Sack of Athens by the Heruli in 267 AD
 Sack of Athens during the Slavic incursions in 582 AD
 Siege of the Acropolis (1402–03) by Antonio I Acciaioli against Venice
 Siege of the Acropolis (1456–58) by the Ottomans against the Latin Duchy of Athens
 Siege of the Acropolis (1687) by the Venetians against the Ottomans, during the Morean War
 Siege of the Acropolis (1821–22) by the Greeks against the Ottomans, during the Greek War of Independence
 Siege of the Acropolis (1826–27) by the Ottomans against the Greeks, during the Greek War of Independence

Events in Athens
Military history of Athens
Set index articles on ancient Greece
Lists of battles